Benjamin Lewis Jones (born August 30, 1941) is an American actor, politician, playwright, and essayist, best known for his role as Cooter Davenport in The Dukes of Hazzard. Jones also served for four years in the United States House of Representatives from January 3, 1989, to January 3, 1993.

Early life and career 

Jones was born in Edgecombe County, North Carolina, near McNair's Railroad Crossing, on August 30, 1941. His father was Hubert C. "Buck" Jones, a railroad section foreman and his mother was Ila Virginia Stephens, the daughter of a railroad section foreman. Within two weeks of his birth, his family moved to Portsmouth, Virginia. The Joneses lived in a "section house", a railroad company shack without indoor plumbing and electricity. That house was next to the Pinners Point Railyard that led to the shipping piers there. He graduated from Woodrow Wilson High School in 1959 and worked at a number of odd jobs to save money for college. In 1960 he entered East Carolina College (now East Carolina University) and in 1961 he was accepted into the University of North Carolina at Chapel Hill, based upon his promise as a writer.

At Chapel Hill, Jones spent summers with the railroad on a work train that contracted to various railroads throughout the South. In 1962, while at UNC, he began acting with the Carolina Playmakers and was soon earning money at it in "summer stock" and at the outdoor drama "Unto These Hills" in Cherokee, North Carolina.

During the 1960s Jones was deeply involved in the Civil rights movement. He was arrested during sit-ins, and was attacked on two occasions by the KKK.

Career

Acting 
Jones has appeared in over 100 theatrical productions, including stints at the Kennedy Center, the Berkshire Theatre Festival, and numerous regional theatres. He relocated to Atlanta in 1969 and acted there with the Alliance Theatre, the Atlanta Children's Theatre, The Theatre of the Stars, and The Winter Playhouse. He also toured for two years with Eva Marie Saint in national productions of Summer and Smoke and Desire Under the Elms. In Atlanta he appeared in numerous television and radio commercials and began landing supporting roles in films, including Smokey and The Bandit (with Burt Reynolds and Jerry Reed), The Bingo Long Traveling All-Stars & Motor Kings (with James Earl Jones and Richard Pryor) and with Tim Conway in They Went That-A-Way & That-A-Way.

The Dukes of Hazzard 
In the mid-1970s, he had a supporting part in an independent film called The Moonrunners, written and directed by Atlantan Gy Waldron and featuring country star Waylon Jennings doing the music and narration. That film was the basis for "The Dukes of Hazzard," which began filming in 1978 about two miles from Jones's then residence in Covington, Georgia. Jones was cast in the role of "Cooter" Davenport, the sidekick mechanic of cousins Bo and Luke Duke. The show immediately rose to the top of the Nielsen ratings. In the days before cable, satellite dishes and the internet, "The Dukes" commonly attracted 40 million viewers weekly on CBS-TV.

Jones continued to live in Georgia and commuted to Los Angeles for the continued filming of "The Dukes." He served as president of the Georgia Branch of the Screen Actors Guild and was appointed chairman of the Georgia Film Commission.

United States Congress 
In 1986, he ran for Congress in Georgia's Fourth Congressional District against incumbent Pat Swindall. Although considered a long shot at best, Jones received over 47% of the vote in defeat.<ref>Barone, Michael; and Ujifusa, Grant. The Almanac of American Politics 1988', p. 296. National Journal, 1987.</ref> He sought a rematch in 1988, after Swindall had been indicted for perjury. Jones won by a 20-point margin and was re-elected in 1990. 

In the 101st and 102nd Congresses, he served as a Democratic whip, was a member of the Committee on Veteran's Affairs and a member of the Committee on Public Works and Transportation. After re-districting took his seat, he ran against Newt Gingrich in 1994. He was defeated, but in the course of that race he filed ethics charges against Gingrich alleging that Gingrich had used tax-exempt groups for political purposes. Gingrich was ultimately reprimanded by the House of Representatives and ordered to reimburse the House an amount of $300,000 for the cost of the investigation. One of the last Yellow dog Democrats, Jones is now a political independent.

 Post-Congress 
After serving in Congress, Jones returned to show business and was cast in the role of Arlen Sporkin in director Mike Nichols’ "Primary Colors" with John Travolta and Emma Thompson. He also appeared in Meet Joe Black and Joe Gould's Secret, in addition to reprising his role of "Cooter" in two "Dukes of Hazzard" reunion specials.

In 1998, Jones and his wife Alma Viator bought a colonial log cabin and farm in Rappahannock County, Virginia, adjoining the Shenandoah National Park. In 1999, they created a "Dukes of Hazzard" museum and theme store in Sperryville, Virginia, called "Cooter's". It was an immediate success. They now have three such franchises in Pigeon Forge and Nashville, Tennessee, and in Luray, Virginia. Jones and Viator have also produced "Dukes" reunion festivals over the years, including one in Nashville, Tennessee, in 2006 which drew over 100,000 fans from all over the world, which The Tennessean called the largest gathering ever for a "fan" event there. They have continued to keep "Hazzard Nation" growing through their stores, personal appearances and concerts. Jones also tours with Cooter's Garage Band, performing Southern Country/Rock and has recorded 11 CD projects, including 2020's "Play Me an Old Song."

In 2007, Random House published Jones’ memoir, Redneck Boy in the Promised Land, a humorous but unsparing account of Jones’ adventurous life and his battle with alcoholism. In it he wrote, "I got sober the day before I died."

As a writer, Jones has published fiction and poetry, in addition to political commentary in outlets including The Washington Post, The New York Times, The Boston Globe, The Atlanta Journal-Constitution, USA Today, and many others. He has expressed his "maverick" political views on numerous network and cable outlets over the past 40 years.

 Confederate flag controversy 
In 2015, Jones announced his support of the Confederate flag, which can be seen on the exterior top of The Dukes of Hazzard signature car, the General Lee. His defense of the flag served as his response to Warner Bros.' decision to no longer manufacture any merchandise that features the flag, such as the General Lee, and the discontinuation of reruns of the show due to Dylann Roof's infamous reputation associated with the flag.CNN's Ashleigh Banfield Gets Into Shouting Match With Ex-Rep. Ben 'Cooter' Jones on YouTube

Though Jones often refers to his Civil Rights activism in the 1960s, quotes Dr. Martin Luther King, claims a lifelong membership in the NAACP (an organization that "...has been fighting against symbols that glorify the Confederacy...), and calls for a dialog between both sides of the Confederate-flag issue, he dismisses any association between the Confederate flag and slavery. Instead he focuses on his pride in the Confederate flag as a memorial to his ancestors who fought for the Confederate States of America in what he refers to as "The War of Northern Aggression." For example, in a column Jones wrote titled, "The Second War of Northern Aggression," his only mention of slavery is in scare quotes, "Since the North won, the conventional wisdom there is usually simple: the North fought the Civil War to 'free the slaves' and to save the Union from the secessionist traitors of the South." He also attributes any association between the Confederate flag and slavery to a "wave of political correctness" and calls it a "cultural cleansing."

 Filmography 

 Film 

 Television 

 Video games 

References

External links
 
 
 
 Campaign contributions for 2002 U.S. Congressional District 7 of Virginia
 Welcome to Cooters place, Gatlinburg, Tennessee and Nashville, Tennessee
 Profile at Hazzardnet.com
 The Dukes of Hazzard star who could destroy Newt Gingrich... again, Ed Pilkington, The Guardian'', January 26, 2011

1941 births
Living people
People from Tarboro, North Carolina
American actor-politicians
American evangelicals
American male film actors
American male stage actors
American male television actors
Democratic Party members of the United States House of Representatives from Georgia (U.S. state)
Politicians from Portsmouth, Virginia
Southern Baptists
Woodrow Wilson High School (Portsmouth, Virginia) alumni
Baptists from Virginia
Baptists from North Carolina